This is a list of Royal Air Force commands, both past and present. Although the concept of a command dates back to the foundation of the Royal Air Force, the term command (as the name of a formation) was first used in purely RAF-context in 1936 when Bomber Command, Fighter Command, Coastal Command and Training Command were formed. Since that time the RAF has made considerable use of the term. Until early 2007, the RAF had two commands, Strike Command and Personnel and Training Command, which were co-located at RAF High Wycombe. On 1 April 2007, the two were merged to form Air Command.

Commands

See also
Command (military formation)
Royal Air Force
British Armed Forces

References

Citations

Bibliography

Royal Air Force commands
 
 
Com